Štefanovce may refer to several places in Slovakia notably in the Prešov Region.

Štefanovce, Prešov District
Štefanovce, Vranov nad Topľou District